Raymond Chabot Grant Thornton (RCGT) is a member firm of Grant Thornton International Ltd. This Canadian firm covers areas of assurance, tax, advisory, and business recovery, reorganization services and cybersecurity. It has over 5,400 professionals, including more than 450 partners. The company hands over its services to socio-economic sectors like SMEs, large businesses and public and para-public organizations.

Emilio Imbriglio is Raymond Chabot Grant Thornton's President and Jean-Paul David, Partner in the Recovery and Reorganization Group, is Chair of the Partnership Board. The firm has 100+ offices throughout Quebec, as well as in Ottawa and Edmundston. It offers its services and through affiliates: Raymond Chabot Inc, Raymond Chabot Ressources Humaines, Taxo, Operio, Auray Capital, RCGT Consulting and Catallaxy.

History and founders 

Jacques Raymond was born in Montréal on 30 September 1919, to French-Canadian parents. After secondary studies at Collège Jean-de-Brébeuf in Outremont, he took night courses at HEC Montréal, and obtained his title of Chartered Accountant. He later became a Chartered Administrator and Certified Management Consultant.

He founded a small accounting firm in Montreal with Guy Chabot in 1948, named Raymond Chabot, which later became Raymond, Chabot, Martin & Cie when Guy Martin joined the firm. In 1967, with Jacques Paré joining, the business took the name Raymond Chabot Martin Paré, which stayed under that name until May 1998, when they took the current name of Raymond Chabot Grant Thornton, now the biggest of its kind in Quebec. 

Jacques Raymond was President of the Ordre des comptables agréés du Québec and the Canadian Tax Foundation. He was life member of the Institute of Chartered Accountants of Ontario (now CPA Ontario), honorary member of Club social Saint-Denis and Club de tennis Mont-Royal. He also sat on various companies' board. He also had a significant and cultural involvement in the community. For example, he was a long time treasurer for Amitié Canada-Orient, for Association pour l'éducation des enfants arriérés, for Diabète Québec and Conseil Interprofessionnel du Québec; also a CEO of Fondation d'Oncologie Ville-Marie and Fondation du Théâtre du Rideau Vert.

Jacques Raymond got the title of Fellow, indicated by the letters FCA. He was also a recipient of the Queen Elizabeth II Golden Jubilee Medal, and named Man of the month from Commerce magazine; also decorated with the Merit of HEC and title of "Bâtisseur du 20e siècle" from the Chamber of Commerce of greater Montreal. Raymond died on March 6, 2010, in Westmount and had his funeral service at the Church of Saint-Léon-de-Westmount on March 17, 2010.

Services
Assurance
Taxation
Corporate Finance
Advisory
Strategic Performance & Consulting
Private Management
Human Resources
Occupational Health & Safety
Recovery & Reorganization
Technologies

See also 

Grant Thornton International Ltd. 
Raymond Chabot Grant Thornton Park

References

External links 
 Clip about the beginnings of Raymond & Chabot
 10 years' history clip of Raymond & Chabot
 20 years' history clip of Raymond & Chabot
 30 years' history clip of Raymond & Chabot
 40 years' history clip of Raymond & Chabot
 50 years' history clip of Raymond & Chabot
 60 years' history clip of Raymond & Chabot
 Raymond Chabot Grand Thornton logo on one of their heaquarters in Montreal, 2018

Grant Thornton
Accounting firms of Canada
1948 establishments in Quebec
Business services companies established in 1948
Companies based in Montreal